The following lists events that happened during 1951 in Cape Verde.

Incumbents
Colonial governor: Carlos Alberto Garcia Alves Roçadas

Events
June: Portuguese Cape Verde became an overseas province
June 12: eruption of Pico do Fogo

Births
April 26: António do Espírito Santo Fonseca, politician

References

 
1951 in the Portuguese Empire
Years of the 20th century in Cape Verde
1950s in Cape Verde
Cape Verde
Cape Verde